"So Why So Sad" was released by Manic Street Preachers in 2001 and was jointly the first single to be released from the Know Your Enemy album, alongside "Found That Soul". All three members of the band - James Dean Bradfield, Sean Moore and Nicky Wire - share the writing credits. The song reached number eight on the UK Singles Chart.

Background

The song includes the line "burns an expressway to your skull" - a reference to the final track on Sonic Youth's EVOL album, and a Buddy Miles song.

Exclaim! Canada called the track "an outstanding pop song" with a production style "scarily similar" to the Beach Boys.

For all its instrumental eccentricities, "So Why So Sad" is quite simple both structurally and lyrically. The song deals mainly with the paradoxical high rates of depression and anxiety experienced by those living in affluence and comfort. It has also been suggested that a reference to the Dead Sea scrolls and the line "dependent on above" imply that there is a religious connection, but there's no further support for this outside the chorus.

It was the only single from "Know Your Enemy" to be featured on the 2002 compilation Forever Delayed, and was an edited version.

The single version is shorter, with the phrase "So Why, So Why So Sad?" sung only three times instead of four at the end and the drums finish two bars earlier without a fill. The version that appears on Forever Delayed is an edit of the album version with "So Why, So Why So Sad?" sung twice.

Release

Surprisingly launched on the same day as "Found That Soul" this was the first sign of the Manics since the surprise number 1 hit "The Masses Against the Classes" thirteen months earlier.

It reached the UK chart position of number 8 on 10 March 2001, spending 16 weeks in the chart, it is the second longest run in terms of singles in the UK chart by the band. "So Why So Sad" is only beaten by If You Tolerate This Your Children Will Be Next which spent 17 weeks in the chart. In Ireland it peaked on number 16.

The song did better in Finland than in the UK, spending fewer weeks, only 3, the single reached number 4 in the Finnish Charts. In Sweden it reached number 26, spending 5 weeks, in the Netherlands it reached position number 88, and in Germany it peaked on number 94.

The CD also included versions of "Pedestal" and a remix of "So Why So Sad" by Australian outfit The Avalanches whereas the 7" included a live version of "You Stole the Sun from My Heart".

Fewer than 200 copies separated So Why So Sad from Found That Soul placing it 1 place higher at number 8.

Track listing
All tracks written and composed by Nick Jones, James Dean Bradfield and Sean Moore.

CD (UK)
 "So Why So Sad" – 3:55
 "So Why So Sad" (Sean Penn Mix - Avalanches) – 4:58
 "Pedestal" – 4:50

CD (AUS)
 "So Why So Sad" – 3:55
 "So Why So Sad" (Sean Penn Mix - Avalanches) – 4:58
 "Pedestal" – 4:50
 "You Stole The Sun From My Heart" (live at Millennium Stadium, 31 December 1999) – 4:25

Cassette
 "So Why So Sad" – 4:02
 "You Stole The Sun From My Heart" (live at Millennium Stadium, 31 December 1999) – 4:25

Charts

References

2001 singles
Manic Street Preachers songs
Songs written by James Dean Bradfield
Songs written by Sean Moore (musician)
Songs written by Nicky Wire
Song recordings produced by Dave Eringa
2000 songs
Epic Records singles